Ali Reza Khan Azod al-Molk (11 October 1847 – 22 September 1910) was an Iranian politician who acted as regent for the last ruling member of the Qajar dynasty.

Life

Ali Reza Khan Qajar, titled "Azod al-Molk", was the son of Mousa Khan, an uncle of Naser al-Din Shah. Ali Reza was part of the retinue of Naser al-Din Shah in 1870 and 1871, and accompanied him on his pilgrimages to the holy sites in Najaf and Karbala, and in 1873 and 1878 during his travels to Europe.

Ali Reza Khan was governor of Mazandaran and later Minister of Justice. After the overthrow of Mohammed Ali Shah Qajar in 1909, Ali Reza Khan was employed by decision of the Iranian Parliament as regent for the king's son, Ahmad Shah Qajar.

Ali Reza Khan had no formal schooling. He was regarded as an honest politician. At the end of his life he was known as Dai Khan (honorable uncle).

Sources 
 Cyrus Ghani: Iran and the rise of Reza Shah. I.B.Tauris, 1998, S. 11.`

1910 deaths
1822 births
20th-century Iranian politicians
19th-century Iranian politicians
Regents of Iran